The Akaflieg Stuttgart F-1 Fledermaus (Bat) was a glider designed and built in Germany from 1932.

Development 
The 'F.1' was the first glider designed and built at Akaflieg Stuttgart (Akademische Fliegergruppe) using a wind tunnel and innovative thinking. As built, the F.1 had no vertical tail, using rotatable wing-tip panels for roll and yaw control. The fuselage was curved to follow the downwash from the wing and rested solely on a single large skid under the forward fuselage, not having a tail-skid.
The completely enclosed cockpit included a hanging control column, to simplify the control run, and airbrakes, for use on the ground, using the cockpit canopy.
The F.1 entered its first competition at Rhön in 1933, but the technical committee insisted that the glider be given a conventional vertical tail, despite protests that the F.1 had already flown a 300 km distance task as built. The fliegergruppe acquiesced and built a vertical tail overnight, with the F.1 claiming several prizes during the competition.

Specifications (F.1)

See also

References

External links
 Photo of F 1, D-Fledermaus, flown by K.Baur, Rhön 1934.

1930s German sport aircraft
1930s German sailplanes
Glider aircraft
Aircraft first flown in 1933
Akaflieg Stuttgart aircraft